The Head of the River Amstel is a rowing race held annually on the river Amstel in Amsterdam, Netherlands on the 8 km track from Amsterdam to Ouderkerk aan de Amstel. The Willem III Rowing Club organises the race in association with the Amsterdam Rowing Association.

History
The Head of the River Race provided the inspiration for the Head of the River Amstel. The race was held for the first time in 1933 when the Women's Longdistance Championship of the Amstel, organised by Willem III and the Men's Longdistance Championship of the Amstel, organised by the ARB, merged. Since then the race grew to one of the biggest rowing events in the Netherlands with more than 500 boats and 4000 participants. 
For the first 75 years of its existence, the boats started in Ouderkerk and finished in the centre of Amsterdam. In 2007 this was turned around and the regatta now starts in Amsterdam and finishes in Ouderkerk.

External links 
Head of the River Amstel 
Amsterdam Rowing Association (Dutch)
Willem III Rowing Club

References

Head races
Recurring sporting events established in 1933
Rowing competitions in the Netherlands